Hammerin Hank is a sporting nickname which may refer to:

Hank Aaron, former American Major League Baseball Hall of Fame right fielder
Hank Greenberg, former American Major League Baseball Hall of Fame first baseman
Henry Armstrong, former American professional boxer